Karanthai Tamil Sangam is a Tamil language society in Tamil Nadu, India. The society was founded in 1911 to promote the language.
It is the one of the modern Tamil Sangams.

History 
Karanthai Tamil Sangam was founded on 14 May 1911 in Karanthattankudi (also known as Karunthattaikudi and Karanthai), a suburb of Thanjavur, Tamil Nadu. The society was founded by Radhakrishna Pillai with his brother Umamaheswara Pillai as its first president. The Sangam passed a resolution in 1920 to declare Tamil as classical language. In a meeting on 27 August 1937, it condemned the imposition of Hindi in the educational institutions.

Activities 
The society started a literacy journal Tamil polil in 1925. It conducts monthly meetings and seminars on Tamil literature. It established educational institutions to provide Tamil education.

See also 
 Madurai Tamil Sangam

References 

Indic literature societies
Tamil-language literature
Tamil organisations